The Roman Catholic Diocese of Virac (Lat: Dioecesis Viracensis) is a diocese of the Latin Church of the Roman Catholic Church in the Philippines. The Diocese of Virac, Catanduanes was established in 1974, from territory in the Diocese of Legazpi and the diocese is a suffragan of the Archdiocese of Caceres.

The current bishop is Manolo Alarcon de los Santos, appointed in 1994.

History
The Diocese of Virac in the islands of Catanduanes was canonically established on August 27, 1974 with the Most Rev. Jose Crisologo Sorra, from Virac, as the first Bishop. At the start, there were 16 parishes (11 town parishes and 5 barrio parishes) and around 25 priests in the active ministry assigned in the different parishes, diocesan commissions and offices, and in the seminary.

The Minor Seminary and Pre-College Seminary
The Immaculate Conception Minor Seminary, located at the Fiat Compound in Cavinitan, was opened in 1976.  The first batch of first year high school seminarians stayed at a dormitory located at the Immaculate Conception Seminary Academy (formerly Immaculate Conception Academy) in downtown Virac, where they also went for their academic studies. In the school year 1976-77, these seminarians were transferred to the Nazareth Homes (west wing) until the seminary was ready to house them. They used the present study hall as their dormitory while the seminary dorm was on its final finishing. The seminary dormitory was finished and used in the school year 1978-1979.

The Minor Seminary attracted many young boys, and many parents, and served as a seedbed for young vocations to the priesthood until the year 1984 when, together with the Immaculate Conception Seminary Academy (ICSA), it had to close due to financial constraints. The closure the Minor Seminary and ICSA was a great loss indeed.

In June 1986, the seminary reopened as a Pre-College Seminary. Those who wish to enter the College Seminary (Philosophy) undergo a one-year training formation at the Pre-College Seminary. This has become an alternative to the Minor Seminary and instead of spending four years of high school studies in the seminary before proceeding to College Seminary, one can opt to study high school outside the seminary and then enter the Pre-College Seminary for one year before proceeding to the College Seminary.

In school year 2005-2006, the diocese opened a Minor Seminary again, together with the revival of the Immaculate Conception Seminary Academy (ICSA), the former Immaculate Conception Academy (ICA), now called Immaculate Conception Academy Students and Alumni School (ICASAS), occupying the Stella Maris building and compound, in Concepcion, downtown Virac. The revived ICA/ICSA is now under the administration of ICA/ICSA Alumni, with the blessing of the Bishop of Virac. The first batch of first year high school seminarians go to this school for their academic training.

The Bishop’s Palace and Other Buildings at the Fiat Compound
The Bishop’s Palace was built adjacent to the seminary. The Nazareth Homes, located at the back of the seminary, were originally constructed as quarters for priests which they could use during their monthly clergy meetings, diocesan affairs, and every time they come to Virac. The Nazareth Homes also served as sleeping quarters for retreatants, Marriage Encounterers, Youth Encounterers and visitors. To facilitate retreats, recollections and meetings, an Octagon Hall was constructed between the seminary and Nazareth Homes.

Other buildings followed. Beside the seminary, the Fiat Printing Press. And at the back of the Nazareth Homes, the Rattan Shop. These two establishments catered to the out-of-school youth who were employed at the Press and the Rattan Shop. The Rattan Shop closed in 1993. The Fiat Press continues to function until today.

The Episcopate
Jose Sorra, first Bishop of Virac, served the diocese until 1993 when he was transferred to the Diocese of Legaspi. The diocese was vacant [sede vacante] for almost a year until September 12, 1994 when a new Bishop of Virac was installed: the Most Rev. Manolo Alarcon de los Santos, from the Archdiocese of Caceres.

The First Diocesan Synod
On the occasion of the silver jubilee of the Diocese of Virac, Bishop de los Santos convoked the First Diocesan Synod held on August 28 to September 8, 1999. The synod was a very opportune event in the diocese to see and evaluate what has become of the diocese after 25 years of existence, and thus set a new direction and vision for the diocese, if necessary.

The greatest achievement of the synod is the launching and implementation of the diocesan thrust called the New Evangelization Pastorale (NEP), authored by the Rt. Rev. Msgr. Jose Borja Molina, PA, Moderator Curiae, Finance Administrator, Vicar General, and Parish Priest of the Cathedral Parish of Our Lady of the Immaculate Conception, Virac. During the synod, he presented the Main Working Paper on Christian Life titled: “Renewing the Christian Life: Agenda for the Third Millennium”. As the main document of the synod, we have adopted it as the Principle of the Diocesan Pastoral Plan.

The NEP would be the soul of the Diocesan Pastoral Plan which the synod primarily envisioned to make in order to give a common goal and direction to all pastoral activities in the entire diocese as expressed in the Diocesan Vision made during the synod. As a diocesan thrust, the NEP would be implemented in all Parishes and Mission Churches in the diocese.

The First Diocesan Pastoral Assembly
Five years after the First Diocesan Synod, another milestone marked the history of the diocese: on August 24–27, 2004 Bishop de los Santos called for a Diocesan Pastoral Assembly to see and evaluate the pastoral work of the Local Church and address some relevant issues affecting the Church, in line with the Diocesan Vision and the diocesan thrust of the New Evangelization Pastorale.

Once again, the Pastoral Assembly emphasized the urgent implementation of the NEP in all Parishes and Mission Churches, and the immediate creation of the Diocesan Pastoral Plan.

In that Pastoral Assembly, the major diocesan commissions at work presented their statutes, locating and aligning all their existing and future programs and activities with the stages, principles and structures of the NEP.

The Diocesan Pastoral Plan
Since the First Diocesan Synod, the Diocesan Pastoral Council (DPC)  has been created and tasked to draft the Diocesan Pastoral Plan. Hence, various discussions, consultations and deliberations had been done in the parish, vicarial, diocesan, and commission levels under the supervision of the DPC.

After some years of patient waiting, the diocese is now ready to launch and implement the 2005 Diocesan Pastoral Plan of the Diocese of Virac.

Parishes and Mission Churches

As of September 2022, the Diocese of Virac has a total of 41 churches consists of 32 Parishes and 9 mission churches which are in the preparation period of becoming a Parish.

Ordinaries

See also
Catholic Church in the Philippines

References

External links

 
 Diocese of Virac
 Diocese of Virac from GCatholic.org page.
 Diocese of Virac from Catholic Hierarchy

1974 establishments in the Philippines
Christian organizations established in 1974
Roman Catholic dioceses and prelatures established in the 20th century
Roman Catholic dioceses in the Philippines
Roman Catholic Ecclesiastical Province of Cáceres
Religion in Catanduanes